Khalsar may refer to:

 Khalsar, Leh, a village in Ladakh, India
 Khaleh Sar, a village in Gilan, Iran